I Am Comic is a 2010 documentary about the stand-up comedy world directed by Jordan Brady.

Overview
Directed by former stand-up comic Jordan Brady and starring and narrated by ex-comedian turned comedy writer Ritch Shydner, the film explores the world of stand-up comedy and features interviews with some of the top comedians working today.

The film had its world premiere at the 2010 Slamdance Film Festival and is distributed by Monterey Media and IFC Films.

Festivals
I Am Comic has been screened at the following film festivals:
 The Feel Good Film Festival
 Laugh Your Ashville Off Comedy Festival
 Just For Laughs Comedy Festival
 Cinefamily's Comedy Festival
 Little Rock Film Festival
 Slamdance
 Bridgetown Comedy Festival
 Atlanta Film Festival
 Kansas City Jubilee
 James River Film Festival
 Laugh Factory V.I.P. Screening

References

External links

2010 films
2010 documentary films
American documentary films
Documentary films about comedy and comedians
2010s English-language films
Films directed by Jordan Brady
2010s American films